Byzantine–Venetian treaty may refer to:

Byzantine–Venetian treaty of 1082
Byzantine–Venetian treaty of 1265
Byzantine–Venetian treaty of 1268
Byzantine–Venetian treaty of 1277
Byzantine–Venetian treaty of 1285
Byzantine–Venetian treaty of 1390

See also
Nicaean–Venetian treaty of 1219